Bismillapur is a town located in the Punjab province of Pakistan. It is located in Faisalabad District at 31°17'0N 73°3'0E with an altitude of 168 metres (554 feet) and lies near to the city of Lahore. Neighbouring settlements include Bilochwala to the east and Rodasar to the north.

References

Cities and towns in Faisalabad District